A Kropatschek is any variant of a rifle designed by Alfred von Kropatschek.  Kropatschek's rifles used a tubular magazine (constructed of nickel-plated steel) of his design, of the same type used in the Japanese Murata Type 22 and the German Mauser Gewehr 1871/84. While designed for black powder, the Kropatschek action proved to be strong enough to handle smokeless powder.

The Kropatschek was the basis for the French Lebel M1886.

Variants

Austria-Hungary:
 Gendarmerie Repetier-Karabiner M1881: 11 mm Gendarmerie Carbine (also known as M1874/81);
Kropatschek Torpedo Boats Gewehr M1893: 8 mm Navy Rifle for Torpedo boat crews.

France:
 Fusil de Marine Mle 1878: 11 mm Navy Rifle;
 Fusil d'Infanterie Mle 1884: 11 mm Infantry Rifle;
 Fusil d'Infanterie Mle 1885: 11 mm Infantry Rifle.

Portugal:
 Espingarda de Infantaria 8 mm m/1886: 8 mm Infantry Rifle; 
 Carabina de Caçadores 8 mm m/1886: 8 mm Light Infantry Carbine; 
 Carabina de Cavalaria 8 mm m/1886: 8 mm Cavalry Carbine; 
 Carabina da Guarda Fiscal 8 mm m/1886/88: 8 mm Treasury Guard Carbine; 
 Espingarda de Infantaria 8 mm m/1886/89: 8 mm Colonial Infantry Rifle; 
 Carabina de Artilharia 8 mm m/1886/91: 8 mm Artillery Carbine.

See also

 Antique firearms

References

External links

 French 1878 Marine Kropatschek Forgotten Weapons

World War I Austro-Hungarian infantry weapons
Bolt-action rifles
Early rifles